Jean-Luc Perrot (born 23 May 1959 in Moulins, Allier, in Central France) is a French organist, carillonneur, composer and musicologist.

Biography 
Jean-Luc Perrot is agrégé of musicology, Doctor of literature and arts (musicology), lecturer at the École Supérieure du Professorat et de l'Éducation (former IUFM) of Saint-Étienne after being a lecturer at the Jean Monnet University of this same town, where he previously taught organology, accompaniment and free value Arts Lyriques. The holder of the historical organ Callinet (1837) of Notre-Dame in Saint-Étienne, his thesis on L'orgue en France de 1789 à 1860 led him to discover many forgotten sheet music. In January 2013, he was appointed to replace Henri Delorme on the François-Henri Clicquot organ in Souvigny, alongside Madeleine Cordez and Pierre Dubois. He is the author of several articles, analyzes, CD booklets, and historical notices. He also plays the harmonium, the harpsichord and the carillon.

His recordings L'Héritage de l'orgue classique, Suites et versets (on the organ of La Chaise-Dieu), Beauvarlet-Charpentier à Souvigny, Maîtres français du XVIIe à Pommiers en Forez (as harpsichordist), four-handed works on the large organ of the Cathedral of Rodez in the company of Georges Lartigau and recently a CD devoted to the unpublished works of Michel Corrette at La Chaise-Dieu showed his attachment to rare music scores. His last recording on the organ of Villerupt is devoted to a certain number of forgotten Romantic composers (Petrali, Smart, Brosig, La Tombelle, Becker). His concerts have taken him all over France but also in Italy, Poland, Germany, Spain and Canada. He has recently performed several improvisational experiments, notably in long sessions of accompanying silent films.

Alongside his teaching activities (he has deepened pedagogy at the University Institute of Teacher Training and gives many courses and master classes), he founded the Baroque ensemble La Clémence d'Urfé. Jean-Luc Perrot is also a composer: He has written several pages for organ alone and organ with 4 hands, works for choir, carillon, or various formations of chamber music. His first Suite à quatre mains pour l'orgue dans le style français, including in particular a third in size entitled Le tombeau de Georges Cziffra was published by La Sinfonie d'Orphée.

He also gives numerous lectures both in France and abroad, for associations, for the CNRS, or at international conferences (Brussels, Paris, Poland).

He collaborated in the publication of facsimile works in the series Patrimoine et Mémoire de l'orgue, at éditions Musicreprints (works by Benaut, Miné, Daussoigne-Méhul, Batiste). He is secretary of the Cavaillé-Coll Association.

Jean-Luc Perrot is chevalier in the Ordre des Palmes académiques.

References

External links 
 Échos de Souvigny 11 centenaire de la Maison de Bourbon, Jean-Luc Perrot aux orgues historiques Clicquot de la priorale de Souvigny  YouTube
 Jacques Boyvin Pieces from Book 2 : Plein Jeu, Trio, Basse et dessus de Trompette, Fugue, Récit grave, Dialogue en Fugue sans tremblant. François-Henri Clicquot organ from Souvigny  YouTube
 Édouard Batiste Offertoire op. 40 en si mineur YouTube
An excerpt from a recital with works by Theodore Lack, Louis Vierne and Jacques-Nicolas Lemmens, YouTube
 Extraits du Kyrie de la messe Cunctipotens (1531) YouTube
 Michel Corrette Offertoire la St-François, sur les orgues Dom Bedos restituées par Pascal Quoirin de l'église Sainte-Croix in Bordeaux  YouTube

1959 births
Living people
20th-century French musicologists
21st-century French male musicians
21st-century French musicologists
21st-century organists
Carillonneurs
Chevaliers of the Ordre des Palmes Académiques
Composers for carillon
French classical organists
French composers
French male organists
People from Moulins, Allier
Male classical organists